[[Image:CherryRipe1879 by John Everett Millais.jpg|thumb|300px|The Graphics chromolithograph of Cherry Ripe (1879) by John Everett Millais (1829–96)]]Cherry Ripe''' is an English song with words by poet Robert Herrick (1591–1674) and music by Charles Edward Horn (1786–1849) which contains the refrain,

Cherry ripe, cherry ripe,
Ripe I cry,
Full and fair ones
Come and buy.
Cherry ripe, cherry ripe,
Ripe I cry,
Full and fair ones
Come and buy.

An earlier poem by Thomas Campion (1567–1620) used the same title Cherry Ripe, and has other similarities. It is thought that the refrain originated as a trader's street cry.

The song's title has been used in other contexts on a number of occasions since and its tune has also been appropriated for other uses. The song was popular in the 19th century and at the time of World War I.

Alternative Lyrics

During the late 1800s, an alternative version of the song briefly appeared. The lyrics were as follows

Cherry Ripe, Cherry Ripe 
Ripe I cry 
Full and fair ones 
Till I die 
Cherry ripe, Cherry ripe 
Mouse and I 
River's where we're 
Till you die

In popular culture
The song is mentioned in the 1889 farcical novel The Wrong Box, written by Robert Louis Stevenson and his stepson Lloyd Osbourne, in a passage discussing the ubiquity of the penny whistle in late 19th century England, as one of two songs every player of that instrument invariably blows.
The song "Cherry Ripe" is a recurring theme in John Buchan's World War I spy novel Mr Standfast (1919). It identifies Mary Lamington, a young intelligence officer, who falls in love, mutually, with the hero of the novel, General Richard Hannay.
The song is mentioned in Dylan Thomas's 1955 A Child's Christmas in Wales.
The song is mentioned in Book Two, Chapter 16 of George Eliot's 1871 Middlemarch.
Several characters of Iris Murdoch's Booker-prize winning novel The Sea, the Sea (1978), sing "Cherry Ripe" as they land into a party mood.
It is sung by Maud Chapman (played by Hilda Bayley) in the 1942 film, Went the Day Well?.
In the classic 1957 British horror film Night of the Demon (released as Curse of the Demon in North America) the medium uses this song to attain a trance.
It is heard in the 1958 film Smiley Gets a Gun, sung by Ruth Cracknell's character, Mrs Gaspen.
In the 1960 film Bottoms Up it is sung by the character Professor Dinwiddie, who mistakes a public chastisement for a sing-along.
It also featured in the opening episode of the 2007 BBC drama "Lilies", sung by the character May Moss at a gentleman's club.
It was heard in the 1982 musical comedy film Victor Victoria, sung by Julie Andrews at her character's unsuccessful audition at a nightclub.
The song is sung by Alice in the opening sequence in the 1999 television movie Alice in Wonderland.
It shares its name with the numbers station, Cherry Ripe (numbers station), in which the tune was played during intervals.

Paintings

In 1879 it was adopted by John Everett Millais as the title of his immensely popular painting depicting a young girl with cherries. It was based loosely on Joshua Reynolds's portrait of Penelope Boothby. Millais had his niece Lucinda Ruby pose for the portrait only a matter of days before the girl was killed under the arches of London Bridge station. The painting was reproduced in colour as a chromolithograph by the newspaper The Graphic'' as a gift with its Christmas edition. The image vastly increased the newspaper's sales.
A painting by Walter Osborne (1859–1903) of a cherry seller in Ulster also used the title.

See also
 Street cries

Notes

English folk songs
Street cries
Year of song unknown
Songwriter unknown